Jesus ( AD 30 or 33) was a Jewish preacher and religious leader who most Christians believe to be the incarnation of God and Muslims believe was a prophet.

Jesus may also refer to:

People

Religious figures
 Elymas Bar-Jesus, a Jew in the Acts of the Apostles, chapter 13, who opposed the missionary Paul on Cyprus
 Jesus Barabbas (Matthew 27:16–17 margin), pardoned criminal
 Jesus Justus (Colossians 4:11), Christian in Rome mentioned by Paul

Other people with the name
 Jesus (name), as given name and surname, derived from the Latin name Iesus and the Greek .
 Jesús Alou (1942–2023), Dominican baseball player
 Jesus ben Ananias (died ), Jewish nationalist mentioned by Josephus
 Jesus Ben Sira, religious writer, author of the Book of Sirach
 Jesus Christ Allin or GG Allin (1956–1993), American punk rock musician
 Jesús González Díaz (born 1994), simply known as Jesús, Spanish footballer
 Jesús Malverde (1870–1909), Mexican bandit-saint
 Jesús Rodríguez (disambiguation)
 Jesús Vidaña, formerly missing Mexican fisherman
 Gabriel Jesus (born 1997), Brazilian footballer

People with the nickname or stage name
 Jesús (born 1977), stagename of American wrestler Aaron Aguilera
 Chris "Jesus" Ferguson (born 1963), American poker player with trademark long brown hair and beard
 Zola Jesus, stagename of American female singer songwriter Nicole Hummel (born 1989)
 Joshua "Jesus" Kennedy (born 1982), former Australian footballer known during his playing career for his resemblance to traditional depictions of the religious figure
 Kaleth O. Wright, 18th chief master sergeant of the Air Force and popularly known as "Enlisted Jesus"
 Jesus Christ (Internet personality) (born 1980 or 1981), American actor and vlogger
 Jesús (footballer), nickname of Angolan footballer Osvaldo Fernando Saturnino de Oliveira (born 1956)

Arts and entertainment

Film and television
 Jesus (1973 film), an Indian Malayalam film
 Jesus (1979 film), also called The Jesus Film, co-directed by Peter Sykes, John Heyman, and John Krisch
 Jesus (1999 film), an American made-for-television film
 Jesús (2016 film), an internationally co-produced film
 Jesus (South Park), a recurring character on the South Park television series
 Jesus (TV series), a 2018 Brazilian telenovela
 Paul "Jesus" Monroe, a character on the television show The Walking Dead

Music
 Jesus (Blu album), 2011
 "Jesus" (Blu song), 2011
 "Jesus" (Gackt song), 2008
 "Jesus" (Jeremy Faith song), 1971
 "Jesus" (Queen song), 1973 work from the first Queen album, Queen
 "Jesus", a song by Luna Sea from the 1993 album Eden
 "Jesus", a 1968 song by The Velvet Underground from the album The Velvet Underground
 "Jesus", a song by Brockhampton from Saturation II
 "Jesus", a song by Jakobínarína from The First Crusade
 "Jesus", a song by Spiderbait from The Unfinished Spanish Galleon of Finley Lake
 "Jesus", a song by CupcakKe from Audacious

Video games
 Jesus (video game)

Geography
 Jesús (Ibiza), a village on the Island of Ibiza
 Jesús, a village in Tortosa, Spain
 Jesús, Paraguay, a town in Paraguay
 Jesús, Peru, a town in Peru
 Île Jésus, the main island of the city of Laval, north of Montreal
 Jesús District, a district in the canton of Atenas in the province of Alajuela
 Jesús (Metrovalencia), a metro station in Valencia, Spain

Other uses
 Jesus College (disambiguation), multiple locations
 Jesus H. Christ, a common interjection

See also
 
 Christ (title), the Greek title for Messiah, applied to Jesus for his role as the Jewish Messiah in Christianity
 de Jesus
 Isa (name)
 Jesu (disambiguation)
 Jesus Christ (disambiguation)
 Jesus of Nazareth (disambiguation)
 Joshua (disambiguation)
 Yeezus, 2013 album by Kanye West
 Yeshua (disambiguation)
 Yehoshua (disambiguation)